Glen Alpine (An Gleann Ailpein) is a small community in the Canadian province of Nova Scotia, located  in Antigonish County.

References

Communities in Antigonish County, Nova Scotia
General Service Areas in Nova Scotia